Firey Hill is a summit in the Central New York Region of New York. It is located northwest of Starkville, New York.

References

Mountains of Herkimer County, New York
Mountains of New York (state)